The Battle of Vertières was the last major battle of the Haitian Revolution, and the final part of the Revolution under Jean Jacques Dessalines. It was fought on 18 November 1803 between the enslaved Haitian army and Napoleon's French expeditionary forces, who were committed to regaining control of the island.

Vertières is situated just south of Cap-Haïtien (known then as Cap-Français), in the Départment du Nord, Haiti.  By the end of October 1803, the forces fighting the expeditionary troops had already taken over most of the territory of St. Domingue. The only places controlled by the French forces were Môle St. Nicolas, held by Noailles, and Cap-Français, where, with 5,000 troops, French General Rochambeau was at bay.

Background 

In 1802, the revolutionary leader Toussaint Louverture was captured by Napoleon's troops. From the ship that would lead him to his prison cell, and eventual death, Louverture said: “In overthrowing me, you have done no more than cut down the trunk of the tree of black liberty in St. Domingue. It will spring back from the roots, for they are numerous and deep.” After L'Ouverture’s death, Jean Jacques Dessalines continued the fight for liberty by leading the resistance to the French.

Battle 

Dessalines defeated the French army numerous times before the battle of Vertières. During the night of 17–18 November 1803, the Haitians positioned their few guns to blast Fort Bréda, located on the habitation where Louverture had worked as a coachman under François Capois. As the French trumpets sounded the alarm, Clervaux, a Haitian rebel, fired the first shot. Capois, mounted on a great horse, led his Haitian demi-brigade forward despite storms of bullets from the forts on his left. The approach to Charrier ran up a long ravine under the guns of Vertières. French fire killed a number of soldiers in the Haitian columns, but the soldiers closed ranks and clambered past their dead, singing. Capois' horse was shot, faltered and fell, tossing Capois off his saddle. Capois picked himself up, drew his sword; brandished it over his head and ran onwards shouting: "Forward! Forward!" (En avant!  En avant!).

Rochambeau was watching from the rampart of Vertières. As Capois charged forth, the French drums rolled a sudden cease-fire. Suddenly, the battle stopped.  A French staff officer mounted his horse and rode toward the intrepid Capois-la-Mort (Capois-the-Death).  With a loud voice, he shouted: "General Rochambeau sends compliments to the general who has just covered himself with such glory!" Then he saluted the Haitian warriors, returned to his position, and the fighting resumed.

General Dessalines sent his reserves under Gabart, the youngest of the generals, while Jean-Philippe Daut, Rochambeau’s guard of grenadiers, formed for a final charge. But Gabart, Capois, and Clervaux, the last fighting with a French musket in hand and with one epaulette shot away, repulsed the desperate counterattack.

A sudden downpour with thunder and lightning drenched the battlefield. Under cover of the storm, Rochambeau pulled back from Vertières, knowing he was defeated and that Saint-Domingue was lost from France.

Aftermath 
The next morning,  general Rochambeau sent Duveyrier to negotiate with Dessalines. By the end of the day, the terms of the French surrender were settled.  Rochambeau got ten days to embark the remainder of his army and leave Saint-Domingue.  The wounded French soldiers were left behind under lock and key with the expectation that they would be returned to France, but they were drowned a few days later.

This battle occurred less than two months before Dessalines' proclamation of the independent Republic of Haiti on 1 January 1804.
During the Second Restoration, the kingdom of France refused to recognize the independence acquired against the French Republic. In 1826, King Charles X demanded that Haiti pay a compensation of 150 million gold francs before France would recognize the young republic's independence. In 1838, under the July Monarchy, this debt was reduced by King Louis-Philippe to 90 million francs and was paid to France until well into the 2000’s like many African countries still do.  

November 18 has been widely celebrated since then as a Day of Victory in Haiti.

References

External links 
 A Great moment in Haitian History: 
 The Louverture Project: The Battle of Vertières
 The Louverture Project: French Capitulation in Saint-Domingue

Conflicts in 1803
Vertieres 1803
Vertieres 1803
Haitian Revolution
1803 in France
1803 in North America
November 1803 events